Gerhard "Gerdi" Springer (6 February 1927 – 28 July 1999) was an Austrian footballer and coach. He was also an ice hockey player (bronze medalist with the Austrian team at the World Championships 1947;  member of the Austrian team in the men's tournament at the 1956 Winter Olympics.) and coach. Springer's grave is in his home-town Klagenfurt, Carinthia ("Friedhof Annabichl").

He coached, inter alia, SK Sturm Graz, SK Rapid Wien, Austria Klagenfurt, Grazer AK, 1. Wiener Neustädter SC, Alpine Donawitz.

Due to his "defence-playing system", Springer's nick-name was "Karawanken-Herrera" - "Karawanken" are the higher mountains in South Carinthia (near of Klagenfurt) - Helinio Herrera (team-manager in Italy, initiator of "Catenacco").

References

External links
 Rapid Archiv

1927 births
1999 deaths
1. Wiener Neustädter SC managers
Austrian football managers
DSV Leoben managers
Grazer AK managers
SK Rapid Wien managers
SK Sturm Graz managers
Austrian ice hockey players
Olympic ice hockey players of Austria
Ice hockey players at the 1956 Winter Olympics
Sportspeople from Innsbruck